Independence is an unincorporated community in Thurston County, in the U.S. state of Washington. The area is situated on the Chehalis River and is approximately southeast of Chehalis Village.

History
Independence had a post office from 1878 until 1890, and again from 1911 until 1944, when it was discontinued.

References

Unincorporated communities in Thurston County, Washington